Centromyrmex feae, is a species of ant of the subfamily Ponerinae. There are 3 subspecies recognized.

Subspecies
Centromyrmex feae ceylonicus Forel, 1900 - Sri Lanka
Centromyrmex feae greeni Forel, 1901 - Singapore
Centromyrmex feae feae (Emery, 1889) - Philippines, Cambodia, India, Myanmar, Taiwan, Thailand, Vietnam, China

References

External links

 at antwiki.org
Animaldiversity.org
Termites and Ants

Ponerinae
Hymenoptera of Asia
Insects described in 1889